Gargoyle Ridge is a high rock ridge forming the south end of the Cobham Range in the Churchill Mountains of Antarctica. It was so named by the Holyoake, Cobham, and Queen Elizabeth Ranges party of the New Zealand Geological Survey Antarctic Expedition (1964–65) because of the curiously wind-carved rock buttresses on top of the ridge.

References

Ridges of Oates Land